Q'ara Qullu (Aymara q'ara bare, bald, qullu mountain, "bare mountain", also spelled Cara Kkollu) is a mountain in the Bolivian Andes which reaches a height of approximately . It is located in the Oruro Department, Sajama Province, Turco Municipality. Q'ara Qullu lies southwest of Yaritani and north of Qhapaqa.

References 

Mountains of Oruro Department